In project management under the PRINCE2 methodology, a product breakdown structure (PBS) is a tool for analysing, documenting and communicating the outcomes of a project, and forms part of the product based planning technique.

The PBS provides "an exhaustive, hierarchical tree structure of deliverables that make up the project, arranged in whole-part relationship" (Haughey, 2015).

This diagrammatic representation of project outputs provides a clear and unambiguous statement of what the project is to deliver.

The PBS is identical in format to the work breakdown structure (WBS), but is a separate entity and is used at a different step in the planning process. The PBS precedes the WBS and focuses on cataloguing all the desired outputs (products) needed to achieve the goal of the project. This feeds into creation of the WBS, which identifies the tasks and activities required to deliver those outputs. Supporters of product based planning suggest that this overcomes difficulties that arise from assumptions about what to do and how to do it by focusing instead on the goals and objectives of the project – an oft-quoted analogy is that "PBS defines where you want to go, the WBS tells you how to get there".

Example
PBS of a computer (see image on right):
 Main unit
 Housing
 Motherboard
 CPU
 RAM chips
 ...
 Hard disk drive
 Graphics card
 Sound card
 Network card
 Monitor
 Display
 Housing
 Electronic components
 Mouse
 Body
 Optical sensor
 Battery
 Keyboard
 Keys

See also 
 List of project management topics
 Product (business)
 Product description
 Product management
 Project management
 Work breakdown structure
 Value breakdown structure
 Product flow diagram

References

Further reading 
 A Framework for Software Product Line Practice Glossary
 Product Breakdown Structure at PRINCE2 wiki

Project management techniques
Product management
PRINCE2